This is a list of Arkansas–Monticello Boll Weevils football players in the NFL Draft.

Key

Selections

References

Lists of National Football League draftees by college football team

Arkansas–Monticello Boll Weevils NFL Draft